Wenzhou Provenza Football Club (Simplified Chinese: 温州葆隆足球俱乐部) is a defunct Chinese football club from Wenzhou that Competed in the China League Two. The club was founded in April 2007.

Name Changes
 April 2007 – January 2010 "Wenzhou Tomorrow " 温州明日
 January 2010 – March 2011"Wenzhou Provenza" 温州葆隆

References

External links
Team profile at Official FA website

Defunct football clubs in China
Football clubs in China
Sport in Zhejiang
2007 establishments in China